Golbshtadt is a village in Moskalensky District, Omsk Oblast. Golbshtadt belongs to the rural settlement of Yekaterinovka.

Geography
The village is located 7 km south-west of Moskalenki. It is made out of one street which is called Tsentralnaya Ulitsa (Central Street).

History
Golbshtadt was founded in 1907 by settlers from the Black Sea and Volga Germans of the Belovezhskaya colony.

Population

References

Rural localities in Omsk Oblast